Uras is a comune (municipality) in the Province of Oristano in the Italian region Sardinia, located about  northwest of Cagliari and about  southeast of Oristano.

Uras borders the following municipalities: Marrubiu, Masullas, Mogoro, Morgongiori, San Nicolò d'Arcidano, Terralba.

Demographic evolution

References

Cities and towns in Sardinia